The No Sanctuary For Criminals Act is a bill that passed the United States House of Representatives on June 29, 2017. It now proceeds to the United States Senate. The Act restricts taxpayer grant money to sanctuary cities.

See also 
 Executive Order 13768
 Immigration policy of Donald Trump

References 

Statutory law